Garudinia simulana is a moth of the family Erebidae first described by Francis Walker in 1863. It is found on Borneo. The habitat consists of lower montane forests.

References

Cisthenina
Moths described in 1863